General Sir Robert Gordon-Finlayson  (15 April 1881 – 23 May 1956) was a senior British military officer who was appointed Adjutant-General to the Forces in 1939.

Military career
Finlayson entered the British Army from the Suffolk Militia and was commissioned into the Royal Artillery as second lieutenant on 17 March 1900. He was promoted to lieutenant on 3 April 1901, and was attached to the 131 battery of the Royal Artillery, stationed at Chatham. Seconded to serve with the Imperial Yeomanry during the Second Boer War in South Africa on 25 April 1902, he received the temporary rank of captain serving in the 24th battalion, Imperial Yeomanry. He vacated his appointment with the Imperial Yeomanry on 1 August 1902, and returned to the Royal Artillery.

He served during the First World War initially as a Royal Artillery officer with 7th Division from 1914 and transferring to 3rd Division in 1915. He was awarded the DSO in 1915. He became Deputy Assistant Adjutant General, 1 Army Corps in 1916 and then General Staff Officer to a Special Mission to Russia in 1917.

After the War he was Deputy Commander, North Russia Forces, a post he held from 1918 to 1919. He then became an instructor at the Senior Officer School in 1919 before attending the Staff College, Camberley and being appointed Military Assistant to Chief of the Imperial General Staff in 1921. He went on to be a General Staff Officer at the War Office in 1922 and joined the Staff College in 1925.

He was appointed Commander Royal Artillery within 3rd Division in 1927 and Commander Rawalpindi District in India in 1931. He served with 3rd Division again between 1934 and 1936 - this time as General Officer Commanding. He was promoted to General in 1937 and was appointed General Officer Commanding-in-Chief the British Troops in Egypt in 1938.

He also served in World War II being appointed Adjutant General in 1939. In this role he was responsible for organising the Home Guard to defend the United Kingdom in the face of invasion. He was also responsible for the Army Council introducing a colour bar, whereby only those of pure European ancestry could be commissioned as officers.

He became General Officer Commanding-in-Chief, Western Command in 1940 from which post retired in 1941.

He was ADC General to the King from 1940 to 1941. He was also Colonel Commandant of the Royal Artillery from 1936 to 1946 and Colonel Commandant of the Royal Horse Artillery from 1937 to 1947.

He was awarded the CMG in 1918. He was also awarded the CB in 1931 and the KCB in 1937.

Retirement

In retirement he was appointed a Special Commissioner for the Imperial War Graves Commission in 1942 and of the Duke of York's Royal Military School also in 1942.

He was a Deputy Lieutenant for Suffolk. He lived in Kersey in Suffolk.

He was churchwarden of St Mary's Church, Kersey and a memorial was erected in his memory in the church.

Family
He was married to Mary Leslie Richmond and together they went on to have two sons, Air Vice Marshal James Richmond Gordon-Finlayson, Major-General Robert Gordon-Finlayson and a daughter, Mary Leslie, who married to become Mary Boyle, Countess of Cork.

References

Bibliography

External links
Generals of World War II

|-

|-
 

|-
 

1881 births
1956 deaths
British Army generals
Royal Artillery officers
British Army generals of World War II
Deputy Lieutenants of Suffolk
British Army personnel of World War I
British Army personnel of the Russian Civil War
Companions of the Distinguished Service Order
Knights Commander of the Order of the Bath
Companions of the Order of St Michael and St George
People from Hadleigh, Suffolk
War Office personnel in World War II
Graduates of the Staff College, Camberley
Academics of the Staff College, Camberley
British Army personnel of the Second Boer War